William Costello Kennedy,  (August 27, 1868 – January 17, 1923) was a Canadian politician.

Born in Ottawa, Ontario, he was first elected to the House of Commons of Canada in the riding of Essex North in the 1917 federal election as a Laurier-Liberal. He was re-elected as a Liberal in  1921. From 1921 until his death, he was the Minister of Railways and Canals in the government of William Lyon Mackenzie King.

References

External links
 

1868 births
1923 deaths
Liberal Party of Canada MPs
Laurier Liberals
Canadian Ministers of Railways and Canals
Members of the House of Commons of Canada from Ontario
Members of the King's Privy Council for Canada